Vasiliy Stepanov may refer to:

Vasiliy Stepanov (actor) (born 1986), Russian actor
Vasiliy Stepanov (canoeist), Soviet canoer
Vasilijs Stepanovs (1927–2011), Soviet weightlifter